Subhadra is a Hindu goddess mentioned in ancient scriptures like the Mahabharata and the Bhagavata Purana. She was a princess from the Yadava clan and the younger sister of the deities Krishna and Balarama. She was the wife of Arjuna, one of the Pandava brothers, with whom she had a son named Abhimanyu.

Subhadra is one of the three deities worshipped at the Jagannath Temple at Puri, along with Krishna (as Jagannatha) and Balarama (or Balabhadra). One of the chariots in the annual Ratha Yatra is dedicated to her.

Etymology and other names
The Sanskrit name Subhadrā is made up of two words: su and bhadrā. The prefix su denotes goodness, while bhadrā is translated as fortune or excellence. The name means 'glorious', 'fortunate', 'splendid', or 'auspicious'.

Subhadra is referred to as Bhadrā (भद्रा), literally 'fortunate', when she is introduced to Arjuna in the Mahabharata. According to the appendix of the Mahabharata, the Harivamsa, her birth name was Citrā (चित्रा) which means 'bright, clear, excellent, or colourful'.

Subhadra is sometimes referenced as Ekanamsha, an ancient goddess who has been historically identified with her.

Legends

Marriage

According to the Chaturdhara Edition of the Mahabharata, Arjuna was in the midst of self-imposed pilgrimage, for breaking terms of the agreement he had with his brothers regarding private time with their common wife Draupadi. After he reached the city of Dvaraka and met his maternal cousin Krishna, he attended a festival held at Raivata mountain. There Arjuna saw Subhadra and was smitten by her beauty and wished to marry her. Krishna revealed that she was Vasudeva's and Rohini's child, and his half-sister. Krishna stated that he couldn't predict Subhadra's decision at her swayamvara (self choice ceremony) and advised Arjuna to elope with Subhadra. After receiving agreement to a letter sent to Yudhishthira for permission, Arjuna drove a chariot to the hills and took Subhadra with him. After Subhadra's guards unsuccessfully attempted to stop them, the Yadavas, the Vrishnis, and the Andhakas held a meeting to discuss the matter. After Krishna comforted them, they agreed, and thus, Arjuna married Subhadra with Vedic rituals. Similar story is included in the Critical Edition of the Mahabharata, compiled by Bhandarkar Oriental Research Institute.

The Kumbhakonam Edition (Southern Recension) of the Mahabharata attest a different story about Subhadra's abduction. Unlike the Chaturdhara version, this version is a love story from both sides and is also a bit more elaborated on the event. It narrates that during his pilgrimage, Arjuna finally arrives at the location of Prabhasa. Gada, a Yadava chief, who he meets there, tells him about Subhadra and after learning about her, Arjuna becomes eager to wed her. To that end, he dresses as an ascetic and ponders beneath a tree in the hopes that Krishna would assist him in getting married. Meanwhile, in Dvaraka, Krishna learns about Arjuna's wish using his divine abilities and visits Arjuna at Prabhasa. He leads Arjuna to the Raivataka mountain, where a festival was to be observed by all the notable Yadavas. During the festival, Arjuna stumbles across Subhadra while wandering with Krishna, and is smitten by her beauty. Krishna advises him to abduct Subhadra, since they didn't know who she liked. After the festival, Balarama meets the disguised Arjuna, and  invites him to live in the palace in Dvaraka. Subhadra starts tending to every need of the ascetic. Arjuna, on the other hand, is passionately in love on seeing Subhadra before his own eyes. Subhadra observes him and finds the similarity of Arjuna, her aunt’s son, about whom she has heard from Gada and Krishna. After realising that Subhadra also loves him, Arjuna immediately reveals his identity. A great ritual for Shiva is planned at an island near Dvaraka. All the Yadavas, with Balarama at the head, leave for worship. Seeing the opportunity, Arjuna elopes with Subhadra, and marries her. Indra and Shachi descend to perform the wedding rituals.

The Bhagavata Purana adds about Balarama's picking of Duryodhana as Subhadra’s groom without taking her consent. Knowing that after getting the news of Subhadra's to elope, Balarama would wage a war against Arjuna, Krishna decided he will be the charioteer for Arjuna. Arjuna proceeds to take Subhadra and with Krishna, in tow, they leave. After getting the news that Subhadra has eloped with Arjuna. Finally, Balarama consents and conduct the marriage of Subhadra with Arjuna in Dvaraka.

Marital life

When Arjuna returned from his exile to Indraprastha along with Subhadra, he was welcomed by Kunti and his brothers. When he asked about Draupadi, his brothers told him that she is in rage and doesn't want to meet anybody. To save her husband from Draupadi's rage, Subhadra went to her in the attire of a simple cowherd. When Draupadi asked who she was, Subhadra replied that she is her maid. Subhadra then fell down to Draupadi's feet and told her that she never wants to replace her. After such humility, Draupadi hugged Subhadra and accepted her as a younger sister.

Later life
After Parikshit was seated on the throne, while leaving for heaven, Yudhishthira gave the responsibility of keeping both the kingdoms Hastinapura ruled by her grandson and Indraprastha being ruled by Vajranabha, great-grandson of her brother Krishna in harmony. There is no specific mention in the epic about how and when she died but it is believed that after the Pandavas along with Draupadi reached heaven, Subhadra and her daughter-in-law (Uttarā) went to the forest to dwell the rest of their lives as hermits.

Worship 

Subhadra is one of the three deities worshipped at the Jagannath temple at Puri, along with Krishna (as Jagannatha) and Balarama (or Balabhadra). One of the chariots in the annual Ratha Yatra is dedicated to her. Apart from it she is also believed to be worshipped by certain communities in Odisha, West Bengal, Gujarat and Bangladesh.*

There is a village called Bhadrajun in the western part of Rajasthan where Subhadra is worshiped as Dhumda mata since the time of Mahabharata. It is believed that, after eloping with her lover Arjuna and a gruelling journey of three days, the couple got married here.

Many Hindus believe Subhadra to be the reincarnation of goddess Yogmaya who took birth to save Krishna’s life from the wicked Kamsa

In some texts like the Brahma Purana and the Garga Samhita, Subhadra is mentioned as Devi Shatarupa with Arjuna being Svayambhuva Manu. She is also worshiped as Mata Bhuvaneshvari in some sects. Apart from it, Subhadra is sometimes linked with Goddess Lakshmi by some Vaishnavas.

In popular culture
In B. R. Chopra's series Mahabharat (1988), Subhadra was portrayed by Aloka Mukherjee.
In the Hindi TV series Krishna, Subhadra was portrayed by Sonia Kapoor.
 In Star Plus's series Mahabharat (2013), Subhadra was portrayed by Veebha Anand.
 In Star Bharat's popular series RadhaKrishn, Subhadra is portrayed by Aanchal Goswami.

See also
Shri Krishna
Arjuna
Abhimanyu
Balarama

Notes

Citations

Sources

External links

 

People related to Krishna
Characters in the Mahabharata
Deities of Jagannath
Characters in the Bhagavata Purana
Hindu goddesses